Bonnie Lynn Nash-Webber  (born August 30, 1946) is a computational linguist. She is an honorary professor of intelligent systems in the Institute for Language, Cognition and Computation (ILCC) at the University of Edinburgh.

Education and career
Webber completed her PhD at Harvard University in 1978, advised by Bill Woods, while at the same time working with Woods at Bolt Beranek and Newman.

Career and research
Webber was appointed a professor at the University of Pennsylvania for 20 years before moving to Edinburgh in 1998. She has many academic descendants through her student at Pennsylvania, Martha E. Pollack. After retiring from the University of Edinburgh in 2016, she was listed by the university as an honorary professor.

Publications
Webber's doctoral dissertation, A Formal Approach to Discourse Anaphora, used formal logic to model the meanings of natural-language statements; it was published by Garland Publishers in 1979 in their Outstanding Dissertations in Linguistics Series. With Norman Badler and Cary Phillips, Webber is a co-author of the book Simulating Humans: Computer Graphics Animation and Control (Oxford University Press, 1993).

With Aravind Joshi and Ivan Sag she is a co-editor of Elements of Discourse Understanding, with Nils Nilsson she is co-editor of Readings in Artificial Intelligence, and with Barbara Grosz and Karen Spärck Jones she is co-editor of Readings in Natural Language Processing.

Awards and honours
Webber was appointed a Fellow of the Association for the Advancement of Artificial Intelligence (AAAI) in 1991, and was elected a Fellow of the Royal Society of Edinburgh (FRSE) in 2004. She served as president of the Association for Computational Linguistics (ACL) in 1980, and became a Fellow of the Association for Computational Linguistics in 2012, "for significant contributions to discourse structure and discourse-based interpretation". In 2020, she was awarded the Association for Computational Linguistics Lifetime Achievement Award.

References

1946 births
Living people
American computer scientists
Linguists from the United States
Women linguists
British computer scientists
Linguists from the United Kingdom
Harvard University alumni
University of Pennsylvania faculty
Academics of the University of Edinburgh
Fellows of the Royal Society of Edinburgh
Fellows of the Association for the Advancement of Artificial Intelligence
Fellows of the Association for Computational Linguistics
Computational linguistics researchers
Natural language processing researchers